Agdistis krooni is a moth in the family Pterophoridae. It is known from South Africa (Northern Cape province).

The forewings are grey without apparent dots. The longitudinal medium part of the wing has a noticeable ochre tinge. The hindwings are uniformly grey. Adults are in wing in March and November.

Etymology
The species is named after Dr D. Kroon, South Africa, a researcher of microlepidoptera.

References

Endemic moths of South Africa
Agdistinae
Moths of Africa
Moths described in 2009